Agrococcus jenensis is the type species of the bacterial genus Agrococcus. It is notable for having diaminobutyric acid in its cell wall peptidoglycans.

References

Further reading
Whitman, William B., et al., eds. Bergey's manual® of systematic bacteriology. Vol. 5. Springer, 2012.

External links

Type strain of Agrococcus jenensis at BacDive -  the Bacterial Diversity Metadatabase

Microbacteriaceae
Bacteria described in 1996